Sindhudurg railway station is a train station on the Konkan Railway. It is at a distance of  down from origin. The preceding station on the line is Kankavali railway station and the next station is Kudal railway station.

References

Ratnagiri railway division
Railway stations in Sindhudurg district